ReminderNews is a newspaper that circulates throughout the eastern portion of Connecticut. Founded in 1949, the company is now known as ReminderMedia and also produces yellow-page directories (known as the Gold Pages).
The 16 local editions of the paper are filled primarily with photos, feature articles, human interest, sports, politics and education and business news. There is also a section, as in many other periodicals, known as "Speak Out", in which reader editorials dealing with local and national issues are published. The newspaper also includes "Teen Speak Out", which features local teens' perspectives.

In 2014, ReminderNews was purchased by the Hartford Courant.

References

External links

Newspapers published in Connecticut
Vernon, Connecticut
Tolland County, Connecticut
Tribune Publishing